The Pitati (Egyptian:  ,) were a contingent of archers of ancient Egypt that were often requested and dispatched to support Egyptian vassals in Canaan. They are recorded in the correspondence of the 1350 BC Amarna letters, and were often requested to defend against the Habiru, also rogue vassal-kings and foreign troops of neighboring kingdoms (for example, Hatti), who were on the attack.

The vassal cities and "city-states" were constantly requesting the services (protection) of the Pharaoh's armies, by means of this "archer-army" force, basically garrison forces. A request for lodging, and preparations of food, drink, straw, and other supplies required, is often demanded by the pharaoh, for a small, or a large contingent.

The pitati archer force were mercenaries from the southern Egyptian "land of Kush" (named Kaša, or Kaši in the letters).

The first use of Nubian mercenaries was by Weni of the Sixth Dynasty of Egypt during the Old Kingdom of Egypt, about 2300 BC.

A letter example--no. 337
A vassal–state letter example from Hiziru, a "mayor", often referred to as the "Man (Lugal) of the City", in ancient Palestine is EA 337, entitled "Abundant supplies ready". The letter is short and undamaged:

"Archers and myrrh"
Letter no. 3 of 5 by Milkilu of Gazru (modern Gezer):

Analysis
Part of the debate in analyzing the army-archer-force is whether the army just annually accompanied the pharaoh's commissioner or envoy and were then extracting tribute, or whether the archer-force duty was strictly military, and in support of the Egyptian borderlands control and influence. The short time period of the Amarna letters, 15–20 years, (17?), may give an answer to the influence of the archer-forces.

See also
Letters from Yidya, (EA 325)

References

Moran, William L., 1992. The Amarna Letters. Johns Hopkins University Press, 1987, 1992. (softcover)

Canaan
Amarna letters
History of archery
Egyptian archers
Myrrh